The Broxbourne Council election, 1987 was held to elect council members of the Broxbourne Borough Council, the local government authority of the borough of Broxbourne, Hertfordshire, England.

Composition of expiring seats before election

Election results

Results summary 

An election was held in 14 wards on 7 May 1987.

15 seats were contested (2 seats in Cheshunt Central Ward)

The Conservative Party made two gains at the expense of the SDP – Liberal Alliance with wins in Hoddesdon Town Ward and Rosedale Ward.

The political balance of the council following this election was:

Conservative 34 seats
Labour 6 seats
SDP-Liberal Alliance 2 Seats

Ward results

References
Cheshunt & Waltham Telegraph Thursday 14 May 1987 Edition

1987
1987 English local elections
1980s in Hertfordshire